Following the dissolution of the Austro-Hungarian Empire in 1918 at the end of World War I, the Czechs and Slovaks united to form the new nation of Czechoslovakia. The United States recognized Czechoslovakia and commissioned its first ambassador on April 23, 1919.

Nazi Germany invaded Czechoslovakia in March 1939, establishing a German "protectorate", the Protectorate of Bohemia and Moravia. By this time, Slovakia had already declared independence and had become a puppet state of Germany, the Slovak Republic. German forces occupied Prague on March 15, 1939. The U.S. embassy was closed on March 21, 1939 and the ambassador left his post on April 6, 1939.

During World War II the U.S. maintained diplomatic relations with the Czechoslovak government-in-exile in London. Ambassador Anthony J. Biddle, Jr. established an embassy in London on September 17, 1941 and the embassy was maintained until the end of World War II in Europe. Following the war the embassy in Prague was reopened on May 29, 1945.

In June 1992, the Slovak parliament voted to declare sovereignty and the Czech-Slovak federation dissolved peacefully on January 1, 1993. The United States recognized the Czech Republic and Slovakia as independent nations and moved to establish diplomatic relations. The previous ambassador to Czechoslovakia, Adrian A. Basora, continued as the ambassador to the Czech Republic. Paul Hacker, the incumbent U.S. consul general, served as the first chargé d'affaires of the U.S. Embassy in Slovakia (January 1 to July 7, 1993), followed by Eleanor Sutter.  In November 1993, Theodore E. Russell, former deputy chief of mission in Prague, became the first U.S. ambassador to Slovakia.

Ambassadors

Richard Crane – Political appointee
Title: Envoy Extraordinary and Minister Plenipotentiary
Appointed: April 23, 1919
Presented credentials: June 11, 1919
Terminated mission: December 5, 1921
Lewis Einstein – Political appointee
Title: Envoy Extraordinary and Minister Plenipotentiary
Appointed: October 8, 1921
Presented credentials: December 20, 1921
Terminated mission: Left post, February 1, 1930
Abraham C. Ratshesky – Political appointee
Title: Envoy Extraordinary and Minister Plenipotentiary
Appointed: January 25, 1930
Presented credentials: May 2, 1930
Terminated mission: Left post, May 13, 1932
Henry Frank Holthusen – Political appointee
Title: Envoy Extraordinary and Minister Plenipotentiary
Appointed:
Presented credentials:
Terminated mission:
Francis White – Career FSO
Title: Envoy Extraordinary and Minister Plenipotentiary
Appointed: June 13, 1933
Presented credentials: September 7, 1933
Terminated mission: Relinquished charge on November 30, 1933
J. Butler Wright – Career FSO
Title: Envoy Extraordinary and Minister Plenipotentiary
Appointed: March 9, 1934
Presented credentials: October 25, 1934
Terminated mission: Left post, June 1, 1937
Wilbur J. Carr – Political appointee
Title: Envoy Extraordinary and Minister Plenipotentiary
Appointed: July 13, 1937
Presented credentials: September 16, 1937
Terminated mission: April 6, 1939
Note: The embassy in Prague was closed on March 21, 1939, following the occupation of Prague by German forces on March 15. The U.S. opened an embassy in London and maintained diplomatic relations with the government-in-exile of Czechoslovakia during the war.
Anthony J. Biddle, Jr. – Political appointee
Title: Envoy Extraordinary and Minister Plenipotentiary
Appointed: September 17, 1941
Presented credentials: October 28, 1941
Terminated mission: June 4, 1943
Note: The title of the commission was changed to Ambassador Extraordinary and Plenipotentiary in 1943. This required a new commission for the ambassador.
Anthony J. Biddle, Jr. – Political appointee
Title: Ambassador Extraordinary and Plenipotentiary
Appointed: June 4, 1943
Presented credentials: July 12, 1943
Terminated mission: Left London on December 1, 1943
Note: After Germany’s surrender at the close of WWII in Europe, the mission of the embassy in London was terminated. Rudolph E. Schoenfeld was serving as chargé d'affaires ad interim when the embassy was closed.
Note: The embassy in Prague was re-established on May 29, 1945, with Alfred W. Klieforth as chargé d'affaires ad interim.
Laurence A. Steinhardt – Political appointee
Title: Ambassador Extraordinary and Plenipotentiary
Appointed: December 20, 1944
Presented credentials: July 20, 1945
Terminated mission: Left post, September 19, 1948
Joseph E. Jacobs – Career FSO
Title: Ambassador Extraordinary and Plenipotentiary
Appointed: October 15, 1948
Presented credentials: January 5, 1949
Terminated mission: Left post, October 12, 1949
Ellis O. Briggs – Career FSO
Title: Ambassador Extraordinary and Plenipotentiary
Appointed: September 1, 1949
Presented credentials: November 8, 1949
Terminated mission: Left post, August 27, 1952
George Wadsworth – Career FSO
Title: Ambassador Extraordinary and Plenipotentiary
Appointed: October 8, 1952
Presented credentials: December 29, 1952
Terminated mission: Left post, October 30, 1953
U. Alexis Johnson – Career FSO
Title: Ambassador Extraordinary and Plenipotentiary
Appointed: November 10, 1953
Presented credentials: December 31, 1953
Terminated mission: Left post, December 29, 1957
John M. Allison – Career FSO
Title: Ambassador Extraordinary and Plenipotentiary
Appointed: March 12, 1958
Presented credentials: April 24, 1958
Terminated mission: Relinquished charge on May 4, 1960
Christian M. Ravndal – Career FSO
Title: Ambassador Extraordinary and Plenipotentiary
Appointed: July 21, 1960
Presented credentials: September 16, 1960
Terminated mission: Left post, May 6, 1961
Note: After 1961 the succeeding ambassadors were commissioned to the Czechoslovak Socialist Republic.
Edward T. Wailes – Career FSO
Title: Ambassador Extraordinary and Plenipotentiary
Appointed: July 14, 1961
Presented credentials: July 28, 1961
Terminated mission: Left post, October 22, 1962
Outerbridge Horsey – Career FSO
Title: Ambassador Extraordinary and Plenipotentiary
Appointed: November 14, 1962
Presented credentials: January 3, 1963
Terminated mission: Relinquished charge on August 1, 1966
Jacob D. Beam – Career FSO
Title: Ambassador Extraordinary and Plenipotentiary
Appointed: May 27, 1966
Presented credentials: August 31, 1966
Terminated mission: Left post, March 5, 1969
Malcolm Toon – Career FSO
Title: Ambassador Extraordinary and Plenipotentiary
Appointed: May 13, 1969
Presented credentials: July 31, 1969
Terminated mission: Left post, October 11, 1971
Albert W. Sherer, Jr. – Career FSO
Title: Ambassador Extraordinary and Plenipotentiary
Appointed: February 15, 1972
Presented credentials: March 15, 1972
Terminated mission: Left post, July 29, 1975
Thomas Ryan Byrne – Career FSO
Title: Ambassador Extraordinary and Plenipotentiary
Appointed: May 1, 1976
Presented credentials: June 23, 1976
Terminated mission: Left post, November 15, 1978
Francis J. Meehan – Career FSO
Title: Ambassador Extraordinary and Plenipotentiary
Appointed: March 23, 1979
Presented credentials: May 30, 1979
Terminated mission: Left post, October 20, 1980
Jack F. Matlock, Jr. – Career FSO
Title: Ambassador Extraordinary and Plenipotentiary
Appointed: September 28, 1981
Presented credentials: November 11, 1981
Terminated mission: September 20, 1983
William H. Luers – Career FSO
Title: Ambassador Extraordinary and Plenipotentiary
Appointed: November 14, 1983
Presented credentials: December 29, 1983
Terminated mission: Left post, March 11, 1986
Julian Niemczyk – Political appointee
Title: Ambassador Extraordinary and Plenipotentiary
Appointed: August 18, 1986
Presented credentials: October 2, 1986
Terminated mission: Left post, July 7, 1989
Shirley Temple Black – Political appointee
Title: Ambassador Extraordinary and Plenipotentiary
Appointed: August 3, 1989
Presented credentials: August 23, 1989
Terminated mission: Left post, July 12, 1992
Adrian A. Basora – Career FSO
Title: Ambassador Extraordinary and Plenipotentiary
Appointed: June 15, 1992
Presented credentials: July 20, 1992
Terminated mission: December 31, 1992
Note: The Czech and Slovak Federal Republic ceased to exist on December 31, 1992. For later ambassadors, see United States Ambassador to the Czech Republic and United States Ambassador to Slovakia.

See also
Ambassadors from the United States
United States Ambassador to the Czech Republic
United States Ambassador to Slovakia

Notes

Sources
United States Department of State: Ambassadors to Czechoslovakia
United States Department of State: Background notes on the Czech Republic

External links
United States Embassy in Prague

1919 establishments in the United States
1992 disestablishments in the United States
Czechoslovakia
 
United States
United States